The Braille pattern dots-356 is a 6-dot braille cell with the middle right and both bottom dots raised, or an 8-dot braille cell with the upper-middle right and both lower-middle dots raised. It is represented by the Unicode code point U+2834, and in Braille ASCII with the number 0.

Unified Braille

In unified international braille, the braille pattern dots-356 is used to represent various punctuation, often coupled with Braille pattern dots-236 as a closing mark.

Table of unified braille values

† Abolished in Unified English Braille

Other braille

Plus dots 7 and 8

Related to Braille pattern dots-356 are Braille patterns 3567, 3568, and 35678, which are used in 8-dot braille systems, such as Gardner-Salinas and Luxembourgish Braille.

Related 8-dot kantenji patterns

In the Japanese kantenji braille, the standard 8-dot Braille patterns 678, 1678, 4678, and 14678 are the patterns related to Braille pattern dots-356, since the two additional dots of kantenji patterns 0356, 3567, and 03567 are placed above the base 6-dot cell, instead of below, as in standard 8-dot braille.

Kantenji using braille patterns 678, 1678, 4678, or 14678

This listing includes kantenji using Braille pattern dots-356 for all 6349 kanji found in JIS C 6226-1978.

  - 止

Variants and thematic compounds

  -  ん/止 + selector 1  =  欠
  -  selector 1 + ん/止  =  氏
  -  selector 4 + ん/止  =  缶
  -  selector 6 + ん/止  =  焉
  -  比 + ん/止  =  低

Compounds of 止

  -  仁/亻 + ん/止  =  企
  -  囗 + ん/止  =  武
  -  お/頁 + ん/止  =  賦
  -  龸 + 囗 + ん/止  =  斌
  -  を/貝 + 囗 + ん/止  =  贇
  -  か/金 + 囗 + ん/止  =  錻
  -  こ/子 + ん/止  =  歴
  -  き/木 + こ/子 + ん/止  =  櫪
  -  に/氵 + こ/子 + ん/止  =  瀝
  -  や/疒 + こ/子 + ん/止  =  癧
  -  む/車 + こ/子 + ん/止  =  轣
  -  ち/竹 + こ/子 + ん/止  =  靂
  -  に/氵 + ん/止  =  渋
  -  に/氵 + ん/止 + お/頁  =  瀕
  -  に/氵 + に/氵 + ん/止  =  澁
  -  ね/示 + ん/止  =  祉
  -  の/禾 + ん/止  =  穢
  -  ん/止 + む/車  =  凪
  -  ん/止 + つ/土  =  址
  -  ん/止 + て/扌  =  捗
  -  ん/止 + そ/馬  =  歩
  -  さ/阝 + ん/止 + そ/馬  =  陟
  -  ん/止 + の/禾  =  歯
  -  ん/止 + ろ/十  =  齢
  -  ん/止 + ん/止 + ろ/十  =  齡
  -  ん/止 + も/門  =  齣
  -  れ/口 + ん/止 + の/禾  =  噛
  -  ん/止 + ん/止 + の/禾  =  齒
  -  せ/食 + ん/止 + の/禾  =  囓
  -  ひ/辶 + ん/止 + の/禾  =  齔
  -  そ/馬 + ん/止 + の/禾  =  齟
  -  囗 + ん/止 + の/禾  =  齠
  -  や/疒 + ん/止 + の/禾  =  齦
  -  ぬ/力 + ん/止 + の/禾  =  齧
  -  み/耳 + ん/止 + の/禾  =  齲
  -  け/犬 + ん/止 + の/禾  =  齶
  -  ん/止 + り/分  =  帰
  -  ん/止 + ん/止 + り/分  =  歸
  -  ん/止 + ひ/辶  =  歳
  -  ん/止 + に/氵  =  渉
  -  ん/止 + ら/月  =  肯
  -  ん/止 + お/頁  =  頻
  -  心 + ん/止 + お/頁  =  蘋
  -  く/艹 + ん/止 + ん/止  =  蕋
  -  ゆ/彳 + 宿 + ん/止  =  徙
  -  に/氵 + 龸 + ん/止  =  沚
  -  に/氵 + う/宀/#3 + ん/止  =  澀
  -  ち/竹 + 宿 + ん/止  =  篶
  -  み/耳 + 宿 + ん/止  =  耻
  -  み/耳 + 龸 + ん/止  =  趾
  -  さ/阝 + 宿 + ん/止  =  阯
  -  ん/止 + み/耳 + selector 2  =  齪
  -  ん/止 + ら/月 + れ/口  =  齬
  -  ん/止 + と/戸 + ゆ/彳  =  齷

Compounds of 欠

  -  れ/口 + ん/止  =  吹
  -  や/疒 + ん/止  =  嵌
  -  氷/氵 + ん/止  =  次
  -  ふ/女 + ん/止  =  姿
  -  そ/馬 + ん/止  =  羨
  -  心 + ん/止  =  茨
  -  ん/止 + ⺼  =  盗
  -  ん/止 + ん/止 + ⺼  =  盜
  -  れ/口 + 氷/氵 + ん/止  =  咨
  -  ゑ/訁 + ん/止  =  諮
  -  る/忄 + 氷/氵 + ん/止  =  恣
  -  か/金 + 氷/氵 + ん/止  =  瓷
  -  の/禾 + 氷/氵 + ん/止  =  粢
  -  も/門 + ん/止  =  欧
  -  も/門 + も/門 + ん/止  =  歐
  -  た/⽥ + ん/止  =  欲
  -  る/忄 + た/⽥ + ん/止  =  慾
  -  か/金 + ん/止  =  歌
  -  く/艹 + ん/止  =  歎
  -  け/犬 + ん/止  =  歓
  -  け/犬 + け/犬 + ん/止  =  歡
  -  火 + ん/止  =  炊
  -  む/車 + ん/止  =  軟
  -  ん/止 + を/貝  =  欣
  -  て/扌 + ん/止 + を/貝  =  掀
  -  ん/止 + き/木  =  欺
  -  ん/止 + か/金  =  欽
  -  ん/止 + ね/示  =  款
  -  ん/止 + せ/食  =  飲
  -  ん/止 + ん/止 + せ/食  =  飮
  -  よ/广 + ん/止 + selector 1  =  厥
  -  け/犬 + ん/止 + selector 1  =  獗
  -  み/耳 + ん/止 + selector 1  =  蹶
  -  つ/土 + ん/止 + selector 1  =  坎
  -  そ/馬 + ん/止 + selector 1  =  歃
  -  氷/氵 + ん/止 + selector 1  =  歇
  -  ち/竹 + ん/止 + selector 1  =  篏
  -  ん/止 + ん/止 + selector 1  =  缺
  -  む/車 + ん/止 + selector 1  =  蠍
  -  も/門 + ん/止 + selector 1  =  闕
  -  囗 + 宿 + ん/止  =  嗽
  -  る/忄 + 宿 + ん/止  =  懿
  -  ん/止 + め/目 + し/巿  =  欷
  -  ん/止 + selector 6 + む/車  =  欸
  -  ん/止 + け/犬 + か/金  =  欹
  -  ん/止 + り/分 + け/犬  =  歉
  -  ん/止 + す/発 + 火  =  歔
  -  ん/止 + り/分 + 囗  =  歙
  -  ん/止 + selector 6 + り/分  =  歛
  -  ん/止 + 宿 + selector 4  =  歟
  -  に/氵 + 宿 + ん/止  =  漱

Compounds of 氏

  -  日 + ん/止  =  昏
  -  き/木 + 日 + ん/止  =  棔
  -  は/辶 + ん/止  =  反
  -  な/亻 + ん/止  =  仮
  -  な/亻 + な/亻 + ん/止  =  假
  -  ろ/十 + ん/止  =  叛
  -  つ/土 + ん/止  =  坂
  -  き/木 + ん/止  =  板
  -  へ/⺩ + ん/止  =  版
  -  を/貝 + ん/止  =  販
  -  ひ/辶 + ん/止  =  返
  -  さ/阝 + ん/止  =  阪
  -  せ/食 + ん/止  =  飯
  -  に/氵 + は/辶 + ん/止  =  汳
  -  日 + は/辶 + ん/止  =  皈
  -  か/金 + は/辶 + ん/止  =  鈑
  -  み/耳 + ん/止  =  民
  -  め/目 + ん/止  =  眠
  -  す/発 + ん/止  =  罠
  -  や/疒 + み/耳 + ん/止  =  岷
  -  る/忄 + み/耳 + ん/止  =  愍
  -  ほ/方 + み/耳 + ん/止  =  氓
  -  に/氵 + み/耳 + ん/止  =  泯
  -  い/糹/#2 + み/耳 + ん/止  =  緡
  -  い/糹/#2 + ん/止  =  紙
  -  ん/止 + ふ/女  =  婚
  -  や/疒 + selector 1 + ん/止  =  岻
  -  し/巿 + selector 1 + ん/止  =  帋
  -  そ/馬 + selector 1 + ん/止  =  牴
  -  ま/石 + selector 1 + ん/止  =  砥
  -  ね/示 + selector 1 + ん/止  =  祇
  -  ⺼ + selector 1 + ん/止  =  胝
  -  囗 + selector 1 + ん/止  =  觝
  -  え/訁 + selector 1 + ん/止  =  詆
  -  そ/馬 + 宿 + ん/止  =  羝
  -  ん/止 + れ/口 + せ/食  =  舐
  -  き/木 + よ/广 + ん/止  =  柢
  -  ね/示 + 宿 + ん/止  =  祗
  -  ん/止 + 宿 + せ/食  =  鴟

Compounds of 缶

  -  ん/止 + け/犬  =  罐
  -  ん/止 + さ/阝  =  卸
  -  れ/口 + ん/止 + さ/阝  =  啣
  -  ん/止 + こ/子 + selector 1  =  缸
  -  ん/止 + 宿 + す/発  =  罅
  -  ん/止 + を/貝 + を/貝  =  罌
  -  ん/止 + た/⽥ + た/⽥  =  罍
  -  ん/止 + 日 + ち/竹  =  罎

Compounds of 焉 and 正

  -  ん/止 + い/糹/#2  =  正
  -  心 + ん/止 + い/糹/#2  =  柾
  -  ふ/女 + ん/止 + い/糹/#2  =  歪
  -  か/金 + ん/止 + い/糹/#2  =  鉦
  -  ん/止 + 氷/氵  =  政
  -  ん/止 + 数  =  整
  -  ふ/女 + selector 6 + ん/止  =  嫣
  -  ん/止 + 宿 + も/門  =  丐
  -  す/発 + 宿 + ん/止  =  麪

Compounds of 低

  -  よ/广 + ん/止  =  底
  -  て/扌 + ん/止  =  抵

Other compounds

  -  え/訁 + ん/止  =  円
  -  え/訁 + え/訁 + ん/止  =  圓
  -  ち/竹 + ん/止  =  零
  -  に/氵 + ち/竹 + ん/止  =  澪
  -  に/氵 + ん/止 + selector 2  =  滷
  -  れ/口 + 宿 + ん/止  =  唄
  -  ふ/女 + 宿 + ん/止  =  嫩
  -  え/訁 + か/金 + ん/止  =  謌
  -  ん/止 + 宿 + り/分  =  鹸
  -  ん/止 + ひ/辶 + selector 3  =  鹹

Notes

Braille patterns